Elation is an emotion of extreme joy and excitement or/also extreme happiness coupled with relief.

Elation may also refer to:
Carnival Elation, cruise ship
 A type of collineation in perspective geometry where the center lies on the axis
 Elation (album), a 2012 studio album by the band Great White
 Groove Elation, a 1995 album by jazz musician John Scofield

See also 
 Euphoria (disambiguation)